John William Savidan (23 May 1902 – 8 November 1991), nicknamed "Billy", "Bill" or "Jack" and born in Auckland, was a New Zealand long distance runner from 1926.

At the 1930 British Empire Games in Hamilton, Ontario he won the six mile race with a time of 30:49.6 mins, despite stopping over the finish line after what he thought was the last lap and being told that there was a lap to go. The official had inadvertently turned over two discs instead of one. He beat Ernie Harper from England. In the three mile race (equivalent to 5000 meters) he did not finish.

At the 1932 Summer Olympics at Los Angeles he finished fourth in both the 5000 metre event and the 10000 metre competition.

He did not compete in the national championships in 1935 and 1936 as he was working as a stonemason and could not spend the necessary time training, but competed against two Japanese runners who were visiting New Zealand in 1937. Like Malcolm Champion before him he was then for some years Custodian at Auckland's Tepid Baths.

References

External links
 
 

1902 births
1991 deaths
New Zealand male long-distance runners
Olympic athletes of New Zealand
Athletes (track and field) at the 1932 Summer Olympics
Athletes (track and field) at the 1930 British Empire Games
Commonwealth Games gold medallists for New Zealand
Commonwealth Games medallists in athletics
Athletes from Auckland
Medallists at the 1930 British Empire Games